Mikro hattonensis is a species of sea snail, a marine gastropod mollusc in the family Skeneidae.

Distribution
This species occurs in the Atlantic Ocean off the Hatton Bank, Iceland.

References

External links
 To Encyclopedia of Life
 To World Register of Marine Species

hattonensis
Gastropods described in 2010